Durham County (area ) is an historic county in Ontario, Canada. It was named for the English County Durham and city of Durham.  It was created in 1792 but was later merged Northumberland County to form the United Counties of Northumberland and Durham. In 1974, the two counties were split and reorganized, with the former portions of Durham County reorganized into the Regional Municipality of Durham.

History 
Durham County was created in 1792 by a proclamation of Lieutenant Governor Simcoe.  The original boundaries were as follows:

In 1798, the Parliament of Upper Canada passed a statute defining the boundaries of the counties.  Durham was then defined to include:

In 1834, the townships of Verulam, Fenelon and Eldon were added to Durham County.

Mergers and dissolution 

Durham was united administratively with Northumberland County as the United Counties of Northumberland and Durham from 1850 until Durham County was dissolved on January 1, 1974.

Effective January 1, 1974, about half of Durham County was merged with Ontario County to create the Regional Municipality of Durham. The township of Manvers was transferred to Victoria County, which is now the city of Kawartha Lakes, Cavan was transferred to Peterborough County, where it is now part of Cavan-Monaghan, and Hope was transferred to Northumberland County, where it is now part of the town of Port Hope.

The townships of Darlington and Clarke were amalgamated with the Town of Bowmanville and the Village of Newcastle as the Town of Newcastle, and the township of Cartwright was combined with the Ontario County townships of Scugog and Reach to create a new Township of Scugog. In 1993, Newcastle was renamed Clarington.

Historic townships

The county was originally composed of the townships of Cartwright, Manvers, Cavan, Darlington, Clarke and Hope, and portions of what is now Peterborough County, created in 1838.
Cartwright – Area . Located in the northwest portion of Durham County, touching Lake Scugog. The Township was opened in 1816. The name is in honour of Richard Cartwright. Mostly settled between 1850 and 1858 by Irish immigrants. Community centres: Purple Hill, Caesarea, Scugog.  This Township is now in Scugog Township
Cavan – Area 62,296 acres. Settled in 1816. Community centres : Millbrook, Cavan and Carmel. This Township is now in Cavan-Monaghan Township in Peterborough County
Clarke - Area, . Was opened in 1792 and named in honour of General Alured Clarke. Community centres: Newcastle, Newtonville, Crooked Creek, Morgan's Corners, Orono, Kendall, Leskard. This Township is now in Clarington Municipality
Darlington – Area, . It was opened in 1792 and named after the ancient English town. The first European settlers arrived from the United States in 1794. Community centres, Bowmanville, Enniskillen, Tyrone, Courtice. (the settlement was mostly Irish). This Township is now in Clarington Municipality.
Hope – Area, . First settlement was in the town of Port Hope. The Township as opened in 1792 and named in honour Colonel Henry Hope, a member of the Legislative Council of Canada.  The Township is now the Town of Port Hope in Northumberland County
Manvers – Area . Opened in 1816. Named in honour of Charles Pierrepont, 1st Earl Manvers. Community centres: Pontypool, Manvers Station, Janetville, Yelverton, Bethany, Franklin, Brunswick, Burton, Ballyduff, Lotus, Fleetwood, Lifford. Now in the City of Kawartha Lakes.

See also
 List of Ontario census divisions
 List of townships in Ontario

References

External links
map of Durham County

Former counties in Ontario
History of the Regional Municipality of Durham
1974 disestablishments in Ontario
States and territories established in 1792
Populated places disestablished in 1974